The following are the national records in Olympic weightlifting in Germany. Records are maintained in each weight class for the snatch lift, clean and jerk lift, and the total for both lifts by the Bundesverband Deutscher Gewichtheber (BVDG).

Current records

Men

Women

Historical records

Men (1998–2018)

Women (1998–2018)

References
General
German records 
Specific

External links
BVDG website

Records
Germany
Olympic weightlifting
Weightlifting